Garth Frederick Arthur "Garry" Swain (born September 11, 1947) is a Canadian retired professional ice hockey center. He played in both the NHL and WHA.

Born in Welland, Ontario, Swain was drafted fourth overall in the 1968 NHL Amateur Draft by the Pittsburgh Penguins. However, he would play just nine games for the Penguins, spending three seasons with the New England Whalers of the WHA.

External links

1947 births
Living people
Amarillo Wranglers players
Baltimore Clippers players
Canadian ice hockey centres
Charlotte Checkers (SHL) players
Fort Wayne Komets players
Hartford Whalers announcers
Sportspeople from Welland
National Hockey League first-round draft picks
New England Whalers players
Niagara Falls Flyers (1960–1972) players
Pittsburgh Penguins draft picks
Pittsburgh Penguins players
Rhode Island Reds players
Ice hockey people from Ontario